Rab El Thalathine  (رب الثلاثين) is a village in the Marjeyoun District in southern Lebanon.

Name
According to E. H. Palmer, the name Rubb Thelâthin comes from  rubb meaning syrup;  and thelâthin meaning thirty.

History
In 1875, Victor Guérin found it to be a village inhabited by Metawileh. He further remarked that the mosque was constructed out of parts from an old  church.

In 1881, the PEF's Survey of Western Palestine (SWP)  found here "several lintels and cisterns."

They further described it: "A small village, built of stone, containing about 100 Metawileh, situated on a hill-top, surrounded by figs and arable land; water supply from cisterns and spring near, and a small birket.

Modern era
During the 2006 Lebanon War, on the 10th of August, Israeli missiles killed five women in the village, aged from 31 to 82 years of age. There were no indications that Hezbollah fighters were present at the time of the strikes.

References

Bibliography

External links 
Rabb Et Talatine, Localiban
Survey of Western Palestine, Map 2:   IAA, Wikimedia commons

Populated places in Marjeyoun District
Shia Muslim communities in Lebanon